Monowar Hussain is an Indian politician. In 2011 he was elected as MLA of Goalpara East Vidhan Sabha Constituency in Assam Legislative Assembly. He was an All India United Democratic Front politician. He joined Indian National Congress in 2016.

References

Year of birth missing (living people)
Indian National Congress politicians from Assam
All India United Democratic Front politicians
Living people